Bakrie may refer to the following family of Indonesian businesspeople and related organizations: 
Aburizal Bakrie (born 1946), son of Achmad, father of Anindya
Achmad Bakrie, father of Aburizal
Bakrie Group, an Indonesian conglomerate founded by Achmad Bakrie in 1942
Bakrie Sumatera Plantations, an agricultural subsidiary of Bakrie Group 
Bakrie Global Ventura, an Indonesian investment company 
Bakrie Tower, a skyscraper in Jakarta, Indonesia
Bakrie University, a private university in Jakarta, Indonesia 
Adika Nuraga Bakrie (born 1981)
Adinda Bakrie
Anindya Bakrie (born 1974), son of Aburizal